Clarke D. Schmidt (born February 20, 1996) is an American professional baseball pitcher for the New York Yankees of Major League Baseball (MLB). The Yankees selected Schmidt in the first round, with the 16th overall selection, of the 2017 MLB draft. He made his MLB debut in 2020.

Amateur career
Schmidt attended Allatoona High School in Acworth, Georgia. He was not drafted out of high school and played college baseball at the University of South Carolina for the Gamecocks.

As a freshman, Schmidt pitched in 18 games and made 10 starts, pitching to a 2–2 win–loss record with a 4.81 earned run average (ERA) and 55 strikeouts. He became South Carolina's ace as a sophomore in 2016. He pitched in 18 games with 17 starts and went 9–5 with a 3.40 ERA and 129 strikeouts. Schmidt remained the team's number one starter his junior year in 2017. He underwent Tommy John surgery in April 2017.

Professional career
The New York Yankees selected Schmidt in the first round, with the 16th overall selection, of the 2017 MLB draft. On June 24, 2017, the Yankees signed Schmidt for a $2,184,300 signing bonus. He did not see any action in 2017 after signing due to the surgery. He made his professional debut in 2018 and spent time with the GCL Yankees of the Rookie-level Gulf Coast League and Staten Island Yankees of the Class A-Short Season New York-Penn League, going 0–3 with a 3.09 ERA in  innings pitched between the two teams.

Schmidt began 2019 with the Tampa Tarpons of the Class A-Advanced Florida State League. In August, the Yankees promoted him to the Trenton Thunder of the Class AA Eastern League.

The Yankees promoted Schmidt to the major leagues on September 4, 2020. He made his major league debut that day as a relief pitcher.

In the beginning of spring training for the 2021 season, Schmidt was shut down due to a common extensor strain in his right elbow and no ligament damage was shown in an MRI. On March 27, 2021, Schmidt was placed on the 60-day injured list. On August 12, Schmidt was activated off of the injured list and optioned to the Triple-A Scranton/Wilkes-Barre RailRiders.

Schmidt made the Yankees Opening Day roster for the 2022 season. He earned his first major league win on April 19.

Personal life
His brother, Clate Schmidt, played college baseball at Clemson from 2013 to 2016. Clate was diagnosed with Hodgkin's lymphoma in 2015, but recovered, and became a professional player, last playing for the Class-A Dayton Dragons of the Cincinnati Reds organization in 2019.

References

External links

South Carolina Gamecocks bio

1996 births
Living people
Sportspeople from Cobb County, Georgia
Baseball players from Georgia (U.S. state)
Major League Baseball pitchers
New York Yankees players
South Carolina Gamecocks baseball players
Gulf Coast Yankees players
Staten Island Yankees players
Tampa Tarpons players
Trenton Thunder players
Florida Complex League Yankees players
Scranton/Wilkes-Barre RailRiders players